The City of Armagh Rugby Football Club is a rugby union club based in Armagh, Northern Ireland, playing in Division 1B of the All-Ireland League

Honours

Ulster Senior League: 2
 2016-17, 2017-18
Ulster Senior Cup: 3
 2017-18, 2018-19, 2019-20

References

External links

 
 

Irish rugby union teams
Rugby union clubs in County Armagh
Rugby clubs established in 1875
Senior Irish rugby clubs (Ulster)